The European Commissioner for International Partnerships formerly European Commissioner for International Cooperation and Development is the member of the European Commission responsible for overseeing the international cooperation and development policy of the European Union, and for heading the Directorate-General for International Partnerships (DG INTPA). The position was previously titled Commissioner for International Cooperation and Development. The Commissioner has to ensure that European Commission can adapt EU's development policy to the evolving needs of EU's partner countries, delivering on EU's commitments to the Millennium Development Goals (MDGs) and the eradication of poverty in the context of sustainable development. The incumbent Commissioner is former Deputy Prime Minister of Finland, Jutta Urpilainen.

Responsibilities

Commissioner for International Partnerships has to focus on the following:

The main objective will be to ensure the European model of development evolves in line with new global realities. It should be strategic and effective, should create value for money and should contribute to wider political priorities.
-	Building on the current EU–Africa Sustainable Alliance, Prepare a new comprehensive strategy for Africa

-	Conclude the negotiations for a Post-Cotonou agreement with the countries from the African, Caribbean and Pacific Group of States. 
-	Reach comprehensive partnerships with countries of migration origin and transit

-	Ensure that the Europe's external financial assistance 2030 Agenda for Sustainable Development and the Sustainable Development Goals within it

-	Ensure that gender equality and the empowerment of women and girls continue to be a top priority in our international cooperation and development policies.

-	A dedicated focus on supporting civil society around the world. We should ensure they have a far greater role in designing and implementing European policies, programs and projects.

-	Work with other Commissioners to facilitate a swift agreement on the post-2020 Neighborhood, Development and International Cooperation Instrument

Directorate-General for Development and Cooperation (DG DEVCO) has to report to Commissioner for International Cooperation and Development, which helps Commissioner to fulfil his responsibilities.

List of commissioners

References
http://ec.europa.eu/about/juncker-commission/docs/mimica_en.pdf

Portfolios in the European Commission
European Union foreign aid